The Mahabharata is one of the two major Sanskrit epics of ancient India, the other being the Ramayana.

Mahabharata or Mahabharat may also refer to:

Literature 
 Andhra Mahabharatam (11-14th century CE), the Telugu version of Mahabaratha written by Kavithrayam (Trinity of poets)
 Mahabharata (Indonesia), 1157 CE, the Indonesian, Javanese translation Bharatayuddha
 Mahabharata (Rajagopalachari book), 1958, an abridged translation to English by C. Rajagopalachari
 The Mahabharata (Narayan book), 1978, an abridged translation to English by R. K. Narayan   
 The Mahābhārata (Smith book), a translation of the Mahabharata by John D. Smith
 The Mahabharata (play), a 1985 French play by Jean-Claude Carrière and Peter Brook
 Mahabharata (comics), 1985, a comic adaptation of Mahabharata in 42 issues by Amar Chitra Katha
 The Mahabharata Secret, a 2013 novel by Christopher C. Doyle

Film and television
 Mahabharat (1965 film), a film directed by Babubhai Mistri
 Mahabharat (1988 TV series), a successful Indian television series (aired 1988–1990) produced by B. R. Chopra
 The Mahabharata (1989 film), a film directed by Peter Brook
Ek Aur Mahabharat, 1997 TV series
 Kahaani Hamaaray Mahaabhaarat Ki, another 2008 Indian television series, produced by Ekta Kapoor
 Mahabharat (2013 TV series), an Indian mythological series
 Mahabharatham (TV series), a Tamil mythological soap opera
 Mahabharat (2013 film), a 3D animated film directed by Amaan Khan

Places
 Mahabharat Range, also known as the Lesser Himalaya
 Mahabharat, Nepal

See also 
 The Razmnāma (رزم نامہ) is a 16th century Persian translation 
 Nartanasala, a 1963 Telugu film directed by Kamalakara Kameswara Rao